Claridon Township, Ohio may refer to:

Claridon Township, Geauga County, Ohio
Claridon Township, Marion County, Ohio

Ohio township disambiguation pages